Totò nella luna (internationally released as Toto in the Moon) is a 1958 Italian comedy science fiction film written and directed by Steno.  The script was co-written by Lucio Fulci. The film starred Sylva Koscina, fresh from her appearance in the 1958 blockbuster Hercules.

Plot
Achilles Paoloni, employed by Soubrette, a small publishing house of the knight Pasquale Belafronte, writes a science fiction novel that he hopes in vain to publish with the help of the hostile knight.

U.S. scientists are aware that Achilles has a substance in the blood suitable for spaceflight, the glumonio, inheritance of the unusual breast milk-based monkey when he was newborn. When two FBI agents are sent to the office to propose a space mission to Achilles, he thinks they are representatives interested in publishing his novel overseas. The cavalier Pasquale, aware of it, goes back on years of insults and hostility to the poor Achilles and does everything to publish the novel at his own expense, even agreeing to the marriage between the young man and his daughter Lydia. Soon, however, he realizes that it was a mistake: the U.S. does not want to launch the rocket in space at all (the title of the novel by Achilles), but the young man himself, however, also disputed by a mysterious foreign power guided by the interplanetary scientist German Von Braut and the beautiful spy Tatiana.

The planes of the two rival powers are hampered by strange aliens (the Annelids) that send down two "cosoni", identical copies of Pasquale and Achilles, in order for them to be shipped on the moon (a parody of Invasion of the Body Snatchers), this is to prevent the conquest of space most humans affect the peaceful balance between peoples aliens. Comic situations and various misunderstandings cause the true Paschal and "cosone" Achilles are found together on the moon. Pasquale will adapt to living in space only when extraterrestrials will transform the clone of Achilles into a beautiful girl.

Cast 
Totò: Pasquale Belafronte
Sylva Koscina: Lidia
Ugo Tognazzi: Achille 
Sandra Milo: Tatiana
Luciano Salce: Von Braut  
Giacomo Furia: commendator Santoni
Jim Dolen: O'Connor 
Francesco Mulé: il vigile urbano 
Marco Tulli: un creditore

Release
Toto nella luna released on November 28, 1958.

References

Sources

External links
 

1958 films
Films directed by Stefano Vanzina
Italian science fiction comedy films
1950s science fiction comedy films
1958 comedy films
1950s Italian films